The Evesham Vale Light Railway operates in Evesham Country Park in Worcestershire, England.

Locomotives

References

External links

Miniature railways in the United Kingdom
15 in gauge railways in England